Aaron Skonnard is an American businessman and the co-founder and CEO of Pluralsight. Skonnard founded the company in 2004 with Keith Brown, Fritz Onion, and Bill Williams, to provide online video training courses for software developers, IT administrators, and creative professionals.

Early life 
Skonnard says he first began learning to code as a child, when his father brought home an Apple II computer. He later graduated from Brigham Young University in 1996 with a degree in Computer Science. After college, prior to founding Pluralsight, he worked at 3M, Intel, and Axiom Technologies. During this time, he published three books: Essential WinInet, in 1999; Essential XML: Beyond Markup, which he co-wrote with Don Box and John Lam, and was published in 2000; and Essential XML Quick Reference, co-written with Martin Gudgin, and published in 2002.

Career

Pluralsight 

Skonnard, along with Keith Brown, Fritz Onion, and Bill Williams, founded Pluralsight in 2004. Originally, the company focused on classroom training courses for businesses. In 2007, they began to focus exclusively on online video training. As the company grew, they expanded into enterprise subscriptions. Skonnard says that as of 2019, roughly 70% of Fortune 500 companies have Pluralsight enterprise licenses.

Since 2012, the company has raised over $190 million in venture funding, with a Series A in 2012–2013, and a Series B in 2014. Following their Series B, Skonnard announced the company's valuation neared $1 billion, up from less than $100 million in 2012.

Pluralsight has been listed as an Inc. 5000 company since 2013, ranking at 1155 in 2017.

In 2018, the company held its IPO on the NASDAQ, opening at a $15 share price, and closed its first day of trading at $20, which carried a market cap of over $2.5 billion.

Recognition 
Skonnard has been recognized for his leadership as Pluralsight's CEO. In 2013, he received an Ernst & Young Entrepreneur of the Year Award. In 2016, he was announced as one of Utah Business's CEO of the Year honorees. MountainWest Capital Network also named Skonnard their Entrepreneur of the Year for 2016. Skonnard was also awarded Utah CEO of the Year at the inaugural Utah Startup Awards in 2016.

Silicon Slopes 
In November 2015, Skonnard helped launch the Start Foundation, a 501(c)(3) organization hoping to improve Utah's tech industry. At launch, Skonnard was named the foundation's chairman.

In December 2016, the organizations Silicon Slopes and Beehive Startups formed a new nonprofit together. Skonnard explained on Twitter that this would replace the Start Foundation. Skonnard serves on the organization's board, whose mission statement seeks to increase diversity and provide resources for startups and entrepreneurs in Utah.

Investments 
Skonnard has also invested in various tech startups in the Utah area, including Bevy, Divvy, Numetric, and Grow.

Personal life 
He lives in Utah with his wife, Monica, and their five children.

References 

Year of birth missing (living people)
Living people
Brigham Young University alumni
American company founders
Businesspeople from Utah
American Latter Day Saints
American chief executives of education-related organizations